Ana Livia Cordero (July 4, 1931 – February 21, 1992) was a Puerto Rican doctor and political activist.

Early life 
Born in Santurce, Puerto Rico, Cordero lived on the island and in New York City. Both of her parents were professors at the University of Puerto Rico. In New York she met American civil rights activist Julian Mayfield, whom she married in 1954. They had two children.

Career 
Cordero and Mayfield moved to Puerto Rico in 1954, where they lived until 1959. In Puerto Rico, she conducted a Rockefeller-funded research study to determine how to provide adequate medical care to poor rural communities.  In 1960 they traveled to Cuba. In 1961 they moved to the newly independent Ghana, inspired by the leadership of Kwame Nkrumah.  While in Ghana, Cordero ran a women's health clinic and served as physician to W. E. B. Du Bois, tending him until his death in 1963. She was affiliated with the National Institute of Health and Medical Research, Accra.  While living in Ghana, Cordero and Mayfield separated. Mayfield left the country in 1966, and Cordero was expelled shortly after that, eventually returning to Puerto Rico.

In Puerto Rico she continued her work as a doctor and political activist. She advocated Puerto Rican independence, and she was one of the representatives of the Pro-Independence Movement to the 1966 Tricontinental Conference in Havana, Cuba. She was arrested for her activism in 1968.  Her group maintained active contact with the African-American liberation movement on the mainland. In 1978 she was involved in protesting the Cerro Maravilla murders.

Bibliography 
 Cordero, Ana Livia, and Colegio de Abogados de Puerto Rico. Cerro Maravilla: Estudio Del Informe Del Departamento De Justicia. [San Juan], P.R.: Colegio de Abogados de Puerto Rico, 1979.
 Cordero, Ana Livia. “The Determination of Medical Care Needs in Relation to a Concept of Minimal Adequate Care: An Evaluation of the Curative Outpatient Services of a Rural Health Centre.” Medical Care 2, no. 2 (1964): 95–103.

References

External links 
Ana Livia Cordero Papers. Schlesinger Library, Radcliffe Institute, Harvard University.

1931 births
1992 deaths
Puerto Rican physicians
Puerto Rican women physicians
Puerto Rican independence activists
20th-century American physicians
20th-century American women physicians